Rangam is a 1985 Indian Malayalam-language psychological drama film directed by I. V. Sasi and written by M. T. Vasudevan Nair. The film stars Mohanlal as Kathakali artist Appunni, along with Shobana and Raveendran. The film features a musical score composed by K. V. Mahadevan.

Plot

Appunni, a Kathakali artist, is the cousin of Chandramathi who is a classical dancer and Appunni is in love with Chandramathi. Madhavan, son of Karunakarapanickker, who is the owner of Sadanam the Kathakali Kalari, returns from Russia and falls for Chandramathi and eventually they get married. Then enters Jayanthi, an  artist who wants to learn Kathakali and is the daughter of a rich business man.

Cast

Mohanlal as Appunni
Shobhana as Chandrika/Chandramathi
Raveendran as Madhavan
Adoor Bhasi as Kunjikrishnan
Raghavan as Naanu
Sukumari as Chandrika's mother
Santhakumari as Appunni's mother
Kottayam Santha as Mrs. Sundaram
Jagannatha Varma as Karunakara Panikker Ashan
Master Suresh as Rajan
Mahalakshmi as Jayanthi

Soundtrack
The music was composed by K. V. Mahadevan and the lyrics were written by S. Ramesan Nair.

Responses
In a retrospect review, Neelima Menon of The News Minute wrote: "Mohanlal aces the role of the unrequited lover who carries a torch for the lady. And the actor’s transition is more internal, letting us buy into his vocation as a Kathakali dancer effortlessly". In 2020, while writing about Mohanlal in Mathrubhumi, writer M. T. Vasudevan Nair said that, although he loves every roles he enacted in his screenplays, Mohanlal's performance in Rangam and Sadayam stays close to his heart the most.

References

External links
 

1985 films
1980s Malayalam-language films
Indian psychological drama films
Films scored by K. V. Mahadevan
Films directed by I. V. Sasi